Caladenia maritima, commonly known as coastal fingers or Angahook pink fingers, is a species of orchid endemic to Victoria. It has a single, almost hairless leaf and one or white flowers with greenish backs and only occurs in the coastal district of Anglesea.

Description 
The backs of the sepals and petals are greenish with a dark line along the centre. The tip of the labellum is orange and curled under. The sides of the labellum have a few narrow teeth near the tip and there are two short rows of yellow or white calli in the centre of the labellum. Flowering occurs from September to October.

Taxonomy and naming 
Caladenia maritima was first described in 1999 by David Jones from a specimen collected near Anglesea and the description was published in The Orchadian. The specific epithet (maritima) is a Latin word meaning "of the sea".

Distribution and habitat 
Coastal fingers occurs near Anglesea in a single population, growing in woodland with a heathy understorey.

Conservation
Caladenia maritima is not classified under the Victorian Government Flora and Fauna Guarantee Act 1988 or under the Australian Government Environment Protection and Biodiversity Conservation Act 1999 but has been listed as "endangered" in Victoria according to the Advisory List of Rare or Threatened Vascular Plants in Victoria – 2004.

References

maritima
Orchids of Victoria (Australia)
Endemic orchids of Australia
Plants described in 1999
Taxa named by David L. Jones (botanist)